Sylvanus Maritim is a Kenyan politician who was a member of the National Assembly from Ainamoi Constituency. He was a member of the ruling JP prior to the 2022, and now he belongs to the UDA.

Election results

References

Kenyan politicians
Year of birth missing (living people)
Living people
Members of the 12th Parliament of Kenya